Kangawa (written: 寒川 lit. "cold river") is a Japanese surname. Notable people with the surname include:

 (born 1989), Japanese artist
, Japanese Paralympic athlete

Japanese-language surnames